Full contact may refer to:
 Full-contact sport
 Full contact karate
 Full Contact, a 1992 Hong Kong action film directed by Ringo Lam
 Full Contact (2015 film), a Dutch-Croatian film starring Grégoire Colin
 Full Contact (video game), a 1991 beat 'em up videogame for Amiga by Team17
 FullContact, a US-based technology company